Miroslav Bukovsky (born Czechoslovakia) is one of Australia's leading jazz trumpeters and composer/arrangers.

At the ARIA Music Awards of 1994 Bukovsky won the ARIA Award for Best Jazz Album with the album Wanderlust with the band Wanderlust. Miroslav has been on staff at the ANU School of Music since 1999. He is a former student American trumpeter Bill Adam.

Biography 

Born in Czechoslovakia, Bukovsky grew up listening to jazz on illegal 'Voice of America' late-night broadcasts. Originally classically trained, he joined various big bands while still living in Czechoslovakia. When the Soviet army invaded his homeland in 1968, Bukovsky, who was then on tour, decided not to return. He migrated to Australia and soon found a place for himself in the Sydney jazz scene. Despite then having only a basic grasp of English, Bukovsky met a number of musicians and quickly made a name for himself jamming with them. It wasn't long before he was playing in such groups as the Daly-Wilson Big Band and Bob Bertle's Moontrane.

Bukovsky co-founded Ten Part Invention with drummer John Pochee and pianist Roger Frampton in 1986, and has been active as a composer for this band. He has also composed for his other bands, including Major Minority, which he formed in 1987, and Wanderlust, formed in 1991.  Wanderlust then went on to win the ARIA Award for Best Jazz Album of 1994 with their 1993 self-titled first release, Wanderlust (Rufus Records/Universal).

Bukovsky has been teaching at a university level since the mid-seventies, first at the Sydney Conservatorium of Music and currently at the ANU School of Music, and has influenced many Australian jazz performers such as Phil Slater. Influenced by a wide variety of musicians including Louis Armstrong, Freddie Hubbard, Blue Mitchell, Clifford Brown, Dizzy Gillespie, and Miles Davis, Bukovsky incorporates aspects from all jazz styles into his playing. 
He has had a long and established career, and has performed with many groups including:
Bob Bertles' Moontrane
The Bruce Cale Orchestra
Sydney Conservatorium Orchestra
KMA Orchestra
Mark Simmonds' Freeboppers
Renée Geyer
The Daly-Wilson Big Band
Monica and the Moochers
Carl Orr
The Mighty Reapers
Jump Back Jack
Hungarian Rapsadists 
The Australian Art Orchestra

Awards

ARIA Music Awards
The ARIA Music Awards is an annual awards ceremony that recognises excellence, innovation, and achievement across all genres of Australian music. They commenced in 1987. 

! 
|-
| 1994
| Wanderlust
| Best Jazz Album
| 
| 
|-

See also 
 20th century brass instrumentalists
 List of trumpeters
 List of jazz trumpeters
 List of jazz arrangers
 List of Australian composers

References

External links 
 Wanderlust's Official Website
 ANU Staff Profile
 Miroslav Bukovsky on MySpace

Year of birth missing (living people)
Living people
Australian jazz trumpeters
ARIA Award winners
Australian music arrangers
21st-century trumpeters
Wanderlust (jazz band) members